Andre Quintero is the former mayor of El Monte, California. He is a registered Democrat.

Quintero was elected mayor in November 2009, defeating Ernest Gutierrez, and was reelected in November 2011. In 2020 he was defeated by Jessica Ancona.

Education and career
Quintero graduated from UC Riverside and completed law school at UCLA. He currently works as an attorney for the City Attorney of Los Angeles as the Neighborhood Prosecutor for the Central Bureau. Serving as President of the statewide University of California Student Association while attending UC Riverside, Quintero has continuously fought against proposed college fee increases. Andre is a major proponent of El Monte Promise, a program where the city provides funding for the first two years at Rio Hondo College for local residents.

Andre is married to Deborah Quintero, a U.S. History and World Geography teacher at Redlands East Valley High School and has a daughter, Emma Olivia.

References

Living people
Mayors of places in California
People from El Monte, California
21st-century American politicians
California Democrats
Year of birth missing (living people)
2020 United States presidential electors
Hispanic and Latino American mayors in California
Hispanic and Latino American politicians